Mariene Bezerra de Castro (12 May 1978 in Salvador da Bahia) is a Brazilian musician.  She is known for her revival of Northeastern Brazilian musical styles including maracatu and samba de roda.

Mariene began her professional career as a backing vocalist for Timbalada, Carlinhos Brown and Marcia Freire. She began her solo career in 1997. In 2001 she won a Caymmi Award for Best Artistic Production. Her first album was released in 2005. Mariene was made the queen of the 2007 Gay Pride parade in Salvador by the Grupo Gay da Bahia. She performed at the 2016 Rio Olympics closing ceremony with the song "Pelo Tempo Que Durar" du Marisa Monte in front of the Olympic Flame before it was extinguished.

Discography

Studio albums
2005: Abre Caminho
2012: Tabaroinha
2014: Colheita

Live albums
2010: CD Santo de Casa - Ao Vivo
2011: DVD Santo de Casa - Ao Vivo
2013: CD Ser de Luz - Ao Vivo
2013: DVD Ser de Luz - Ao Vivo

External links  
 Site oficial

References

Samba musicians
People from Salvador, Bahia
1978 births
Living people
21st-century Brazilian singers
21st-century Brazilian women singers